The Mäntsälä church village (also known as Mäntsälä) is the administrative center of the municipality by the same name in Uusimaa, Finland, with about 11,000 inhabitants. The Mäntsälänjoki River flows through the church village, which joins the Mustijoki River further south, which runs all the way to the Gulf of Finland.

Etymology 
Mäntsälä's central villageappears in early written material in the form Mensela, Menselä, Mensilä (1458), Mensse (1516), Mentzeby (1540). The village name has evolved from the house name, which probably includes the early host's first name Mäntsä (or Mänssä). It has been interpreted as an abbreviation of the given name Clement. According to Viljo Nissilä, a possible starting point may have been the male name Menze (or Mensse), found in the Friesland area.

Services 

The church village houses the Mäntsälä town hall, the Mäntsälä church completed in 1865, the Mäntsälä health center, several educational institutions, the Mäntsälä multipurpose house and the Mäntsälä railway station. Mäntsälä bus station is one of the busiest stations in rural Finland. Many Mäntsälä residents work in other locations, and bus traffic has long played a significant role in Mäntsälä. The current bus station was completed in 1962.

There are three grocery stores in the church village: K-Citymarket, S-market and Lidl.

Transport 
The church village is located in the middle of the municipality at the intersection of major roads, Highways 4 (E75) and Highway 25, and Main Road 55 in the direction of Porvoo. The current Highway 4 runs as a motorway past the church village, but the old road between Helsinki and Lahti, the current regional road 140, runs directly through it and serves as the main street in the urban area. Next to the motorway is the Kerava–Lahti railway line, which was opened in 2006, along which is the Mäntsälä railway station near the church village.

See also
 Kirveskoski
 Monninkylä
 Numminen, Mäntsälä
 Sälinkää

References

Mäntsälä
Villages in Finland